The Market Cross in Oakham, Rutland, England, is a market cross dating from the 16th or 17th century. Market crosses, also termed butter crosses, may derive from the high crosses or free-standing stones of the Early Mediaeval period. In the Middle Ages they were often used as gathering points in the centres of communities, generally as venues for regular markets. Beneath the cross is a set of stocks. Both are Grade I listed structures and the group forms a Scheduled monument.

History and description
Market crosses can be found in the centres of many British towns and cities. Although their origins are unclear, they are generally believed to derive from the High crosses or free-standing stones of the Early Mediaeval period. In the Middle Ages they frequently became the focal point for marketplaces, where communities gathered to trade. Historic England suggests that the presence of a cross in a marketplace may have served to “validate transactions”. James Masschaele, in his study, The Public Space of the Marketplace in Medieval England, notes that marketplaces also served an important social function as a location for the “retailing of news and gossip”. Their religious associations led to many crosses being damaged or destroyed during the Reformation and in the aftermath of the Civil War.

The Oakham Market Cross dates from the 16th or 17th centuries.  in diameter, a central stone shaft and eight encircling timber posts support a tiled roof. The stocks stand immediately adjacent to the central shaft. They are unusual in that they have five openings, rather than the more common four or six. The cross and the stocks are both Grade I listed structures. The group forms a Scheduled monument.

Notes

References

Sources
 
 
 

Grade I listed buildings in Rutland
Scheduled monuments in Rutland
Oakham
Rutland
Buildings and structures in Rutland
Market crosses in England